America's 11 Most Endangered Places or America's 11 Most Endangered Historic Places is a list of places in the United States that the National Trust for Historic Preservation considers the most endangered. It aims to inspire Americans to preserve examples of architectural and cultural heritage that could be "relegated to the dustbins of history" without intervention.

Many of the locations listed by the Trust have been preserved, with there being some argument about how important the Trust's listing has actually been to their preservation. However, there have been notable losses, such as 2 Columbus Circle, which underwent significant renovations, and the original Guthrie Theater, demolition of which was completed in early 2007.

First released in 1987, the number of sites included on the list has varied, with the most recent lists settling on 11.

2022 Places 
On May 4, 2022, the National Trust announced its annual list of 11 most endangered historic places:

 Brooks-Park Home and Studios, East Hampton, New York
 Brown Chapel AME Church, Selma, Alabama
 Camp Naco, Naco, Arizona
 Chicano/a/x Community Murals of Colorado
 The Deborah Chapel, Hartford, Connecticut
 Francisco Q. Sanchez Elementary School, Humåtak, Guam
 Jamestown, Virginia
 Minidoka National Historic Site, Jerome, Idaho
 Olivewood Cemetery, Houston, Texas
 Palmer Memorial Institute, Sedalia, North Carolina
 Picture Cave, Warren County, Missouri

2021 Places 
On June 3, 2021, the National Trust announced its annual list of 11 most endangered places:

 Selma to Montgomery March Camp Sites, Selma, Alabama
 Trujillo Adobe, Riverside, California
 Summit Tunnels 6 & 7 and Summit Camp Site, Truckee, California
 Georgia B. Williams Nursing Home, Camilla, Georgia
 Morningstar Tabernacle No.88 Order of Moses Cemetery and Hall, Cabin John, Maryland
 Boston Harbor Islands, Boston, Massachusetts
 Sarah E. Ray House, Detroit, Michigan
 The Riverside Hotel, Clarksdale, Mississippi
 Threatt Filling Station and Family Farm, Luther, Oklahoma
 Oljato Trading Post, San Juan County, Utah
 Pine Grove Elementary School, Cumberland, Virginia

2020 places 
On September 24, 2020, the National Trust announced its annual list of 11 most endangered places:

 Alazan-Apache Courts, San Antonio, Texas
 Hall of Waters, Excelsior Springs, Missouri
 Harada House, Riverside, California
 National Negro Opera Company House, Pittsburgh, Pennsylvania
 Ponce Historic Zone, Ponce, Puerto Rico
 Rassawek, Columbia, Virginia
 Roberts Temple Church of God in Christ, Chicago, Illinois
 Sun-n-Sand Motor Hotel, Jackson, Mississippi
 Terrace Plaza Hotel, Cincinnati, Ohio
 West Berkeley Shellmound and Village Site, Berkeley, California
 Yates Memorial Hospital, Ketchikan, Alaska

2019 places 
On May 30, 2019, the National Trust announced its annual list of 11 most endangered places:

 Ancestral Places of Southeast Utah
 Bismarck-Mandan Rail Bridge in Bismarck, North Dakota
The Excelsior Club in Charlotte, North Carolina
Hacienda Los Torres in Lares, Puerto Rico, NRHP-listed
Industrial Trust Company Building (aka "Superman Building") in Providence, Rhode Island
James R. Thompson Center in Chicago
Mount Vernon Arsenal and Searcy Hospital in Mount Vernon, Alabama, NRHP-listed
 Nashville’s Music Row in Nashville, Tennessee
 National Mall Tidal Basin in Washington, D.C.
Tenth Street Historic District in Dallas, Texas
 Willert Park Courts in Buffalo, New York

2018 places
In June 2018, the National Trust announced its list of 11 most endangered places, along with 1 extra site on 'watch status':

Annapolis City Dock Area in Annapolis, Maryland
Ashley River Historic District in Charleston County, South Carolina
Dr. Susan LaFlesche Picotte Memorial Hospital in Walthill, Nebraska
Hurricane-Damaged Historic Resources of Puerto Rico and the US Virgin Islands
Isaiah T. Montgomery House in Mound Bayou, Mississippi
Larimer Square in Denver, Colorado
Mary and Eliza Freeman Houses in Bridgeport, Connecticut
Mount Vernon and Piscataway National Park in Mount Vernon, Virginia and Accokeek, Maryland
Route 66
Wallace E. Pratt House (Ship on the Desert) in Salt Flat, Texas
Walkout Schools of Los Angeles, California (including James A. Garfield High School, Theodore Roosevelt High School, Abraham Lincoln High School, Belmont High School, and El Sereno Middle School)
Four Towns of Vermont's Upper Valley -- Royalton, Sharon, Strafford and Tunbridge, Vermont

2017 places
For 2017, the National Trust for Historic Preservation marked the 30th anniversary of the "America's Most Endangered Places" program by releasing a list of 11 "Success Stories"—sites that were named to the "Most Endangered" list that were the focus of successful preservation efforts:

Antietam National Battlefield in Sharpsburg, Maryland (listed 1988)
Penn School (now Penn Center) in Frogmore, South Carolina  (listed 1990)
"Historic Boston Theaters" in Boston, Massachusetts (collectively referring to the Boston Opera House, the Paramount Theatre, and Modern Theatre) (listed 1995)
Little Rock Central High School in Little Rock, Arkansas (listed 1996)
Cathedral of St. Vibiana in Los Angeles, California (listed 1997)
Governors Island National Monument in New York, New York (listed 1998)
Angel Island Immigration Station in San Francisco, California (listed 1999)
Traveler's Rest in Lolo, Montana (listed 1999)
President Lincoln's Cottage at the Soldiers' Home in Washington, D.C. (listed 2000)
Nine Mile Canyon in Utah (listed 2004)
Statler Hilton Hotel in Dallas, Texas (listed 2008)

2016 places
In June 2016, the National Trust announced its list of 11 most endangered places:
Lions Municipal Golf Course in Austin, Texas
Azikiwe–Nkrumah Hall at Lincoln University in Lincoln University, Pennsylvania
Bears Ears in southeastern Utah 
Charleston Naval Hospital District in North Charleston, South Carolina
Delta Queen in Houma, Louisiana.
Chihuahuita and El Segundo Barrio neighborhoods in El Paso, Texas
Historic Downtown Flemington, New Jersey
James River in James City County, Virginia
Mitchell Park Domes in Milwaukee, Wisconsin
San Francisco Embarcadero in San Francisco, California
Sunshine Mile in Tucson, Arizona

2015 places
The June 2015 announced places are:
A.G. Gaston Motel, in Birmingham, Alabama, once "served as a 'war room' for leaders of the Civil Rights Movement"
Carrollton Courthouse in Carrollton, New Orleans
The Factory in West Hollywood, California
Chautauqua Amphitheater, Chautauqua, New York
East Point Historic Civic Block, East Point, Georgia
Fort Worth Stockyards, Fort Worth, Texas
Grand Canyon, Arizona
Little Havana, Miami
Oak Flat, Superior, Arizona
Old U.S. Mint, San Francisco
South Street Seaport, New York

2014 places 
In June 2014, the National Trust announced its list of 11 most endangered places to be:
Battle Mountain Sanitarium, Hot Springs, South Dakota
Bay Harbor's East Island, Dade County, Florida
Chattanooga State Office Building, Chattanooga, Tennessee
Frank Lloyd Wright's Spring House, Tallahassee, Florida
Historic Wintersburg, Huntington Beach, California
Mokuaikaua, Kailua Village in Kona, Hawaii
Music Hall, Cincinnati, Ohio (subsequently saved)
Palladium Building, St. Louis, Missouri
Shockoe Bottom, Richmond, Virginia
The Palisades, Englewood Cliffs, New Jersey
Union Terminal, Cincinnati, Ohio (subsequently saved)

2013 places 
In June 2013, the National Trust announced its list of 11 most endangered places to be:
Abyssinian Meeting House, Portland, Maine
Astrodome, Houston, Texas (added to the National Register of Historic Places in 2014)
Chinatown House, Rancho Cucamonga, California
Gay Head Lighthouse, Aquinnah, Massachusetts
Historic Rural Schoolhouses of Montana (statewide)
James River, James City County, Virginia
Kake Cannery, Kake, Alaska
Mountain View Black Officers' Club, Fort Huachuca, Arizona
San Jose Church, Old San Juan, San Juan, Puerto Rico
Village of Mariemont, Cincinnati, Ohio
Worldport Terminal at John F. Kennedy International Airport, Jamaica, Queens, New York (subsequently demolished)

2012 places 
In June 2012, the National Trust announced its list of 11 most endangered places to be:
Bridges of Yosemite Valley, Yosemite Village, California
Ellis Island hospital complex, New York Harbor, New York and New Jersey
Historic U.S. post office buildings (nationwide) 
Joe Frazier's Gym, Philadelphia, Pennsylvania (added to the National Register of Historic Places in 2013)
Malcolm X—Ella Little-Collins House, Roxbury, Boston, Massachusetts
Princeton Battlefield, Princeton, New Jersey
Sweet Auburn Historic District, Atlanta, Georgia
Terminal Island, Port of Los Angeles, California
Texas courthouses, Texas (statewide)
Elkhorn Ranch, Billings County, North Dakota
Village of Zoar, Ohio

2011 places
 Bear Butte, Meade County, South Dakota
 Belmead-on-the-James, Powhatan County, Virginia
 China Alley, Hanford, California
 Fort Gaines, Dauphin Island, Alabama
 Greater Chaco Landscape, San Juan County and McKinley County, New Mexico, U.S.
 Isaac Manchester Farm, Avella, Pennsylvania
 John Coltrane Home, Dix Hills, New York
 National Soldiers Home, Milwaukee, Wisconsin
 Pillsbury A-Mill, Minneapolis, Minnesota
 Prentice Women's Hospital, Chicago, Illinois (demolished in 2014)
 Sites Imperiled by State Actions, Nationwide

2010 places
America's State Parks & State-Owned Historic Sites
Black Mountain, Kentucky
Hinchliffe Stadium, Paterson, New Jersey
Industrial Arts Building, Lincoln, Nebraska
Juana Briones House, Palo Alto, California (demolished in 2011)
Merritt Parkway, Fairfield County, Connecticut
Metropolitan AME Church, Washington, D.C.
Pågat, Guam
Saugatuck Dunes, Laketown Township, Allegan County, Michigan
Threefoot Building, Meridian, Mississippi
Wilderness Battlefield, Spotsylvania County and Orange County, Virginia

2009 places
Ames Shovel Shops, Easton, Massachusetts
Cast-Iron Architecture of Galveston, Texas
Century Plaza Hotel, Los Angeles, California
Dorchester Academy, Midway, Georgia
Human Services Center, Yankton, South Dakota
Lana'i City, Maui, Hawaii
Memorial Bridge, Portsmouth, New Hampshire & Kittery, Maine (original closed and demolished in 2012; new bridge opened on same site in 2013)
Miami Marine Stadium, Miami, Florida
Mount Taylor, Grants, New Mexico
The Manhattan Project's Enola Gay Hangar at Wendover Air Force Base, Utah
Unity Temple, Oak Park, Illinois

2008 places
Bonnet House, Fort Lauderdale, Florida
Boyd Theatre, Philadelphia, Pennsylvania (demolished in 2015)
California State Parks, California
Charity Hospital and the surrounding neighborhood, New Orleans, Louisiana
Great Falls Portage, Great Falls, Montana
Hangar One, Moffett Federal Airfield, Santa Clara County, California
Michigan Avenue Streetwall, Chicago, Illinois
Neighborhood of the Lower East Side, New York, New York
Neighborhood of Peace Bridge, Buffalo, New York
The Statler Hilton Hotel, Dallas, Texas
Sumner Elementary School, Topeka, Kansas
Vizcaya Museum and Gardens, Miami, Florida

2007 places
The 2007 places named to the list were:

Brooklyn's Industrial Waterfront, New York, New York (from the Brooklyn Army Terminal in Sunset Park to Greenpoint Terminal Market site)
El Camino Real Historic Trail, New Mexico
H.H. Richardson House, Brookline, Massachusetts
Hialeah Park Race Course, Hialeah, Florida
Historic Places in Transmission Line Corridors
Historic Route 66 Motels, Illinois to California
Historic Structures in Mark Twain National Forest, 29 counties in Missouri
Minidoka Internment Camp, Hunt, Idaho
Philip Simmons Workshop and Home, Charleston, South Carolina
Piñon Canyon Maneuver Site, Colorado
Stewart's Point Rancheria, Sonoma County, California

2006 places
Arts and Industries Building of the Smithsonian Institution, Washington, D.C.
Blair Mountain Battlefield, Logan County, West Virginia
Doo Wop Motels of Wildwood, New Jersey
Fort Snelling Upper Post, Hennepin County, Minnesota
Historic Communities and Landmarks of the Mississippi Coast
Historic Neighborhoods of New Orleans, New Orleans, Louisiana
Kenilworth, Illinois
Kootenai Lodge, Bigfork, Montana
Mission San Miguel Arcángel, San Miguel, California
Over-the-Rhine Neighborhood, Cincinnati, Ohio
World Trade Center Vesey Street Staircase, New York, New York

2005 places
Daniel Webster Farm, Franklin, New Hampshire
The Journey Through Hallowed Ground Corridor, Maryland, Pennsylvania and Virginia
Belleview Biltmore Hotel, Belleair, Florida (largely demolished in 2015)
Camp Security, York County, Pennsylvania
Eleutherian College, Madison, Indiana
Ennis-Brown House, Los Angeles, California
Finca Vigía: Ernest Hemingway House, San Francisco de Paula, Cuba
Historic Buildings of Downtown Detroit, Detroit, Michigan
Historic Catholic Churches of Greater Boston, Boston, Massachusetts
King Island, Alaska
National Landscape Conservation System, Western States

2004 places
2 Columbus Circle, New York, New York
Bethlehem Steel Plant, Bethlehem, Pennsylvania
Elkmont Historic District, Elkmont, Tennessee
George Kraigher House, Brownsville, Texas
Gullah/Geechee Coast, South Carolina and Georgia
Historic Cook County Hospital, Chicago, Illinois
Madison-Lenox Hotel, Detroit, Michigan (demolished in 2005)
Nine Mile Canyon, Utah
Ridgewood Ranch, Home of Seabiscuit, Willits, California
State of Vermont, Vermont
Tobacco Barns of Southern Maryland, Maryland

2003 places
Amelia Earhart Bridge, Atchison, Kansas
Bathhouse Row, at Hot Springs National Park, Arkansas
East Side School and Middle School, Decorah, Iowa
Little Manila, Stockton, California
Michigan Boulevard Garden Apartments, Chicago, Illinois
Minute Man National Historical Park and Environs, Concord, Lincoln and Lexington, Massachusetts
Ocmulgee Old Fields Traditional Cultural Property, Macon, Georgia
TWA Terminal at John F. Kennedy International Airport, Jamaica, Queens, New York
United States Marine Hospital, Louisville, Kentucky
Urban Houses of Worship (nationwide)
Zuñi Salt Lake and Sanctuary Zone, New Mexico

2002 places
Chesapeake Bay Skipjacks, Statewide Maryland
Gold Dome Bank, Oklahoma City, Oklahoma
Guthrie Theater, Minneapolis, Minnesota
Hackensack Water Works, Oradell, New Jersey
Historic Bridges of Indiana, Statewide, Indiana
Kw'st'an Sacred Sites at Indian Pass, Indian Pass, California
Missouri River Cultural and Sacred Sites, Midwestern States, MO, MT, KS, NE, ND, SD
Pompey's Pillar, Billings, Montana
Rosenwald Schools, Southern and Southwestern States, MD, VA, WV, NC, SC, GA, FL, LA, AL, MS, TX, AR, NM, OK
St. Elizabeths Hospital, Washington, D.C.
Teardowns in Historic Neighborhoods, Nationwide

2001 places
Bok Kai Temple, Marysville, California
Carter G. Woodson House, Washington, D.C.
CIGNA Campus, Bloomfield, Connecticut
Ford Island at Pearl Harbor, Honolulu, Hawaii
Historic American Movie Theaters, Nationwide
Jackson Ward, Richmond, Virginia
Los Caminos del Rio Heritage Corridor, Lower Rio Grande Valley, Texas
Miller-Purdue Barn, Upland, Indiana
Prairie Churches of North Dakota, Statewide North Dakota
Stevens Creek Settlements, Lincoln, Nebraska
Telluride Valley Floor, Telluride, Colorado

2000 places
Eisenhower VA Medical Center, Leavenworth, Kansas
Fifth & Forbes Historic Retail Area, Pittsburgh, Pennsylvania
Historic Neighborhood Schools, Nationwide
Hudson River Valley, Statewide, New York
Lincoln cottage, Washington, D.C.
Nantucket, Nantucket, Massachusetts
Okeechobee Battlefield, Okeechobee, Florida
Red Mountain Mining District, Colorado
Santa Anita Racetrack, Arcadia, California
Valley Forge National Historical Park, Valley Forge, Pennsylvania
Wheelock Academy, Millerton, Oklahoma

1999 places
The 1999 list was:

"The Corner of Main and Main" (nationwide)
Angel Island Immigration Station, San Francisco, California
Country Estates of River Road, Louisville, Kentucky
"Four National Historic Landmark Hospitals" in New York (statewide) — specifically, the Utica State Hospital, Hudson River State Hospital, former Buffalo State Hospital, and New York State Inebriate Asylum
Hulett Ore Unloaders, Whiskey Island, Cleveland, Ohio
Lancaster County, Pennsylvania
Pullman Historic District, Chicago, Illinois
Richard H. Allen Memorial Auditorium at Sheldon Jackson College, Sitka, Alaska
San Diego Arts & Warehouse District, San Diego, California
Traveler's Rest, Missoula County, Montana
West Side of Downtown Baltimore, Baltimore, Maryland

1998 places
The 1998 list was:

Black Hawk and Central City, Colorado
Cannery Row, Monterey, California
Chancellorsville Battlefield, Fredericksburg, Virginia
Governors Island, New York, New York
Great Bowdoin Mill, Topsham, Maine
Historic Courthouses of Texas, Texas (statewide)
Historically Black Colleges & Universities (Southern states: Maryland, Virginia, West Virginia, North Carolina, South Carolina, Georgia, Florida, Louisiana, Alabama, Mississippi)
Mapes Hotel, Reno, Nevada (subsequently demolished)
Mesa Verde National Park, Colorado
Michigan's Historic Lighthouses, exemplified by DeTour Reef Light, Michigan (statewide)
Monocacy Aqueduct, Frederick County, Maryland

1997 places
The 1997 list was:

Bridge of Lions, St. Augustine, Florida
Cathedral of St. Vibiana, Los Angeles, California
Congressional Cemetery, Washington, D.C.
Cranston Street Armory, Providence, Rhode Island
Flathead Indian Reservation, Lake, Sanders, Missoula, and Flathead, Montana
Historic Buildings Infested with Formosan Termites, Gulf Coast states (Louisiana, Florida, Texas, Mississippi, Alabama, Georgia)
Montezuma Castle, Montezuma, New Mexico
Stillwater Bridge, Stillwater, Minnesota
Vicksburg Campaign Trail, Missouri and Louisiana
Wa'ahila Ridge, Honolulu, Hawaii

1996 places
The 1996 list was:

Adobe Churches of New Mexico, Statewide New Mexico
East Broad Top Railroad, Rockhill Furnace, Pennsylvania
East End Historic District, Newburgh, New York
Harry S. Truman Historic District, Independence, Missouri
Historic Black Churches of the South, Southern States, MD, VA, WV, NC, SC, GA, FL, LA, AL, MS
Historic Structures in Glacier National Park, Glacier National Park, Montana
Knight Foundry, Sutter Creek, California
Little Rock Central High School, Little Rock, Arkansas
Petoskey, Petoskey, Michigan
Sotterley Plantation, Hollywood, Maryland
Uptown Theatre, Chicago, Illinois
Wentworth-by-the-Sea Hotel, New Castle, New Hampshire

1995 places
The 1995 list was:

Archaeological Treasures of the Colorado Plateau, Statewide Colorado
Ashley River Historic District, Ashley River (South Carolina)
Bronx River Parkway, Bronx, New York
Fair Park's Texas Centennial Buildings, Dallas, Texas
Farish Street Neighborhood Historic District, Jackson, Mississippi
Historic Boston Theaters, Boston, Massachusetts
Ossabaw Island, Ossabaw Island, Georgia
South Pass, South Pass, Wyoming
Tugboat Hoga, Oakland, California
Village of East Aurora, East Aurora, New York
Waikiki Natatorium War Memorial, Honolulu, Hawaii

1994 places
The 1994 list was:

Cape Cod, Massachusetts
Cornices (and Buildings of Harlem), Harlem, New York
Fair Park's Texas Centennial Buildings, Dallas, Texas
Frank Lloyd Wright's Taliesin, Spring Green, Wisconsin
Historic Northern Virginia Piedmont, Virginia Piemont, Virginia
Manuelito Archaeological Complex, Gallup vicinity, New Mexico
Natchez, Natchez, Mississippi
Oldest Surviving McDonald's, Downey, California
Old San Francisco Mint, San Francisco, California
U.S.S. Constellation, Baltimore, Maryland
Virginia City, Montana

1993 places
The 1993 list was:

Brandy Station Battlefield, Fredericksburg, Virginia
Downtown New Orleans, New Orleans, Louisiana
Eight Historic Dallas Neighborhoods, Dallas, Texas
Schooner C.A. Thayer, San Francisco, California
Prehistoric Serpent Mound, Locust Grove, Adams County, Ohio
South Pasadena, California
State of Vermont
Sweetgrass Hills, Montana
Thomas Edison's Invention Factory, West Orange, New Jersey
 Town of Ste. Genevieve, Missouri
Virginia City, Montana

1992 places
The 1992 list was:

Virginia City, Montana
Eight Historic Dallas Neighborhoods, Dallas, Texas
Ellis Island National Monument, New York Harbor, New York, Harlem New York
Gettysburg National Military Park, Gettysburg, Pennsylvania
Louisiana's Historic River Road, Louisiana
Sweet Auburn, Atlanta, Georgia
West Baden Springs Hotel, West Baden Springs, Indiana
Independence National Historical Park, Philadelphia, Pennsylvania
Montpelier, Orange, Virginia
Tiger Stadium, Detroit, Michigan (demolished 2008-09)

1991 places
The 1991 list was:

 Antietam National Battlefield Park, Sharpsburg, Maryland
 Fort Frederica, St. Simons Island, Georgia
 Franklin Post Office, Franklin, Tennessee
 Independence National Historical Park, Philadelphia, Pennsylvania
 Kennecott Mines, Kennecott, Alaska
 Montpelier, Orange, Virginia
 Penn School, Frogmore, South Carolina
 South Pasadena, California
 Southeast Light, Block Island, Rhode Island
 Tiger Stadium, Detroit, Michigan
 Walden Pond and Woods, Concord and Lincoln, Massachusetts

1990 places
The 1990 list was:

 Antietam National Battlefield Park, Sharpsburg, Maryland
 Columbus Landing Site, St. Croix, U.S. Virgin Islands
 Deadwood Historic District, Deadwood, South Dakota
 Fort Frederica, St. Simons Island, Georgia
 Kennecott Mines, Kennecott, Alaska
 Penn School, Frogmore, South Carolina
 Roycroft Inn and Campus, East Aurora, New York
 South Pasadena, California
 Southeast Light, Block Island, Rhode Island
 Walden Pond and Woods, Concord and Lincoln, Massachusetts
 West Mesa Petroglyphs, Albuquerque, New Mexico

1989 places
The 1989 list was:

 Antietam National Battlefield Park, Sharpsburg, Maryland
 Cedar Creek Battlefield and Belle Grove Plantation, Middletown, Virginia
 Columbus Landing Site, St. Croix, U.S. Virgin Islands
 Deadwood Historic District, Deadwood, South Dakota
 Fort Frederica, St. Simons Island, Georgia
 Old Deerfield Historic District, Deerfield, Massachusetts
 Old Kaskaskia Village, Kaskaskia, Illinois
 Roycroft Inn and Campus, East Aurora, New York
 South Pasadena, California
 Vieux Carre Historic District, New Orleans, Louisiana
 West Mesa Petroglyphs, Albuquerque, New Mexico

1988 places
The 1988 list was:

 Antietam National Battlefield Park, Sharpsburg, Maryland
 Cedar Creek Battlefield and Belle Grove Plantation, Middletown, Virginia
 Columbus Landing Site, St. Croix, U.S. Virgin Islands
 Custer Battlefield National Monument & Reno-Benteen Battlefield Memorial, Montana
 Manassas National Battlefield Historic District, Manassas, Virginia
 Old Deerfield Historic District, Deerfield, Massachusetts
 Old Kaskaskia Village, Kaskaskia, Illinois
 Snee Farm, Mt. Pleasant, South Carolina
 Vieux Carre Historic District, New Orleans, Louisiana
 Waterford Historic District, Waterford, Virginia
 West Mesa Petroglyphs, Albuquerque, New Mexico

See also
List of threatened historic sites in the United States

References

External links
 America's 11 Most Endangered Historic Places: Archive

Historic preservation in the United States
Nature conservation in the United States
National Trust for Historic Preservation
Lists of buildings and structures